Grimontia celer is a Gram-negative bacterium species from the genus of Grimontia which has been isolated from sea water.

References 

Vibrionales
Bacteria described in 2016